Rissoina is a large genus of minute sea snails, marine gastropod mollusks or micromollusks, in the family Rissoinidae.

Species
According to the World Register of Marine Species (WoRMS) the following species with valid are included within the genus Rissoina :

 Rissoina achatina Odhner, 1924
  Rissoina achatinoides (Powell, 1937)
 Rissoina adamsi Bartsch, 1915
  †  Rissoina ailinana Ladd, 1966
  † Rissoina alabamensis Aldrich, 1895
 Rissoina alarconi Hertlein & Strong, 1951
 Rissoina albanyana Turton, 1932
 † Rissoina albaresensis Pacaud, 2019 
 † Rissoina albertensis Landes in Russell & Landes, 1940 
 Rissoina alfredi Smith, 1904
 † Rissoina altenai Beets, 1942 
 Rissoina ambigua (Gould, 1849) 
 † Rissoina ame Woodring, 1928 
 Rissoina andamanica Weinkauff, 1881
 Rissoina angasii Pease, 1872
 Rissoina angeli Espinosa & Ortea, 2002
 Rissoina anguina Finlay, 1926
 Rissoina angusta Preston, 1908
 Rissoina antoni Schwartz, 1860
 Rissoina applanata Melvill, 1893
 Rissoina artensis Montrouzier, 1872
 Rissoina aspera Faber, 2013
 Rissoina assimilis Jickeli, 1882
 Rissoina atimovatae Faber, 2018
 † Rissoina aturensis Cossmann & Peyrot, 1919 
 Rissoina aupouria Powell, 1937
 Rissoina barbara Grabau & King, 1928
  † Rissoina barreti Morlet, 1885
 Rissoina basisulcata Faber, 2018
 Rissoina basteroti Schwartz, 1860
 Rissoina bertholleti Issel, 1869
 Rissoina bicollaris Schwartz, 1860
 † Rissoina bikiniensis Ladd, 1966 
 Rissoina bilinea (Laseron, 1956) 
 Rissoina birestes (Laseron, 1956) 
 † Rissoina bonneti Cossmann, 1910 
 Rissoina boucheti Sleurs, 1991
 Rissoina bouvieri Jousseaume, 1894  
 Rissoina (Moerchiella) bozzettii Faber, 2015
 Rissoina brazieri Tenison-Woods, 1876 
  † Rissoina briggsi Ladd, 1966
 Rissoina bruguieri (Payraudeau, 1826)
  †Rissoina bulimina Olsson & Harbison, 1953 
 Rissoina bureri Grabau & King, 1928 
 Rissoina caballeri Faber, 2018
 Rissoina calia Bartsch, 1915
 Rissoina canaliculata Schwartz, 1860
 Rissoina cardinalis Brazier, 1877
  † Rissoina caribella Weisbord, 1962
 Rissoina catholica Melvill & Standen, 1896
 Rissoina cerithiiformis Tryon, 1887
 Rissoina cerrosensis Bartsch, 1915 
 Rissoina chathamensis (Hutton, 1873)
  † Rissoina chipolana Dall, 1892
 Rissoina clandestina (C. B. Adams, 1852)
  † Rissoina cochlearina Meunier in Meunier & Lambert, 1880 
 Rissoina collaxis (Laseron, 1956)
 Rissoina coronadensis Bartsch, 1915
 Rissoina coronata Schwartz, 1860
 Rissoina costata A. Adams, 1853
 Rissoina costatogranosa Garrett, 1873
 Rissoina costulata Dunker, 1860
 Rissoina costulifera Pease, 1862
 Rissoina crassa Angas, 1871
 Rissoina crassilabrum Garrett, 1857
 Rissoina crenilabris Boettger, 1893
 Rissoina cretacea Tenison-Woods, 1878
 Rissoina curtisi E. A. Smith, 1884
 Rissoina debilis Garrett, 1873
 † Rissoina debussa Woodring, 1928 
 Rissoina decapitata (Laseron, 1956) 
 Rissoina delicatissima Raines, 2002
 Rissoina delicatula Preston, 1905
 Rissoina denseplicata Thiele, 1925
 Rissoina deshayesi Schwartz, 1860
 Rissoina dimidiata Jickeli, 1882
 † Rissoina (Moerchiella) dimorpha Gougerot, 1968
 Rissoina dina Bartsch, 1915
 Rissoina distans d'Anton, 1839
 † Rissoina ditomus Woodring, 1928 
 Rissoina dorbignyi A. Adams, 1853
 Rissoina duclosi Montrouzier & Souverbie, 1866
 Rissoina dunedini Grabau & King, 1928
 Rissoina dux (Laseron, 1956) 
 Rissoina dyscrita Faber, 1990
 † Rissoina ekkanana Ladd, 1966 
 Rissoina elegantula Angas, 1880
  † Rissoina emnanana Ladd, 1966
 Rissoina eulimoides A. Adams, 1854
 Rissoina excolpa Bartsch, 1915
 Rissoina exigua Weinkauff, 1881
 Rissoina expansa Carpenter, 1865
  † Rissoina fargoi Olsson & Harbison, 1953
 Rissoina fasciata A. Adams, 1851
 Rissoina favilla Bartsch, 1915
 Rissoina fenestrata Schwartz, 1860
 Rissoina ferruginea (Hedley, 1904)
 Rissoina fictor Finlay, 1930
 Rissoina filicostata Preston, 1905
 Rissoina fimbriata Souverbie, 1872
 Rissoina fischeri Desjardin, 1949
 Rissoina flexuosa Gould, 1861 
 Rissoina fortis (C.B. Adams, 1852)
 Rissoina fratercula Sleurs & Preece, 1994
 Rissoina fucosa Finlay, 1930
 Rissoina funiculata Souverbie, 1866
 Rissoina gemmea Hedley, 1899
 Rissoina gertrudis Tenison-Woods, 1876 
 Rissoina gigantea (Deshayes, 1848)
 Rissoina gisna Bartsch, 1915
 † Rissoina giuntellii Zunino & Pavia, 2009
  † Rissoina goikulensis Ladd, 1966
 Rissoina gracilis Garrett, 1873
  † Rissoina grateloupi (Basterot, 1825)
 † Rissoina guppyi Cossmann, 1921 
 Rissoina guttulata Faber, 2013 
 Rissoina hanleyi Schwartz, 1860
 Rissoina harryleei Rolán & Fernández-Garcés, 2009
 Rissoina hartmanni Jordan, 1935
 Rissoina helena Bartsch, 1915
 Rissoina hernandezi Faber & Gori, 2016
 Rissoina heronensis (Laseron, 1956)
 Rissoina herosae Paulmier, 2017
 † Rissoina herringi Ladd, 1966 
 † Rissoina hoheneggeri Ascher, 1906 
 Rissoina honoluluensis Watson, 1886
  † Rissoina houdasi Cossmann, 1892
  Rissoina hummelincki Jong & Coomans, 1988 
 Rissoina humpa (Chang & Wu, 2004) 
 Rissoina illustris G. B. Sowerby III, 1894
 Rissoina imbricata Gould, 1861
 Rissoina inca d'Orbigny, 1840
 Rissoina incerta Souverbie, 1872
 Rissoina indica G. Nevill, 1885
 Rissoina indiscreta Leal and Moore, 1989 
 Rissoina inermis Brazier, 1877
 Rissoina io Bartsch, 1915
 Rissoina iredalei Laseron, 1950
 Rissoina irregularis Faber, 2018
 Rissoina isolata (Laseron, 1956) 
 Rissoina isosceles Melvill & Standen, 1903
 Rissoina jaffa Cotton, 1952
 Rissoina janus (C.B. Adams, 1852)
 Rissoina jeffreysiensis Tomlin, 1931
 Rissoina jickelii Weinkauff, 1881
 † Rissoina jirikana Ladd, 1966 
 † Rissoina johnsoni Dall, 1892 
  † Rissoina jonkeri Koperberg, 1931
  † Rissoina juncea Gardner, 1947
 Rissoina keenae Smith & Gordon, 1948
 Rissoina kilburni Sleurs, 1993
 Rissoina krebsii (Mörch, 1876)
 Rissoina labrosa Schwartz, 1860 
 † Rissoina lamellosa (Desmoulins, 1836)  
  † Rissoina lanotensis Lozouet, 2011
 Rissoina larochei Finlay, 1930
 † Rissoina lata Traub, 1981 
 Rissoina laurae de Folin, 1870
 Rissoina liletae Poppe, Tagaro & Stahlschmidt, 2015
 Rissoina limicola Faber, 2013
  † Rissoina liriope Olsson & Harbison, 1953
 † Rissoina lomaloana Ladd, 1966 
 Rissoina longispira Sleurs, 1991
 Rissoina longistriata Paulmier, 2017
 Rissoina lutaoi Chang & Wu, 2004
 Rissoina lyrata Gould, 1861
 Rissoina madagascariensis Faber, 2018
 Rissoina maduparensis Beets, 1986 †
 Rissoina maestratii Faber, 2013
 Rissoina manawatawhia Powell, 1937
 † Rissoina (Moerchiella) manzakiana Yokoyama, 1922 
 Rissoina mayori Dall, 1927 
 Rissoina mazatlanica Bartsch, 1915
 † Rissoina mejilana Ladd, 1966 
 Rissoina melanelloides Baker, Hanna & Strong, 1930 
 Rissoina mercurialis Watson, 1886
 Rissoina meteoris Gofas, 2007
 Rissoina mexicana Bartsch, 1915 
 Rissoina micans A. Adams, 1851
 Rissoina millecostata Garrett, 1873
 Rissoina mirjamae Faber & Gori, 2016
 † Rissoina mississippiensis Meyer, 1886 
 Rissoina modesta Gould, 1861
 Rissoina monilifera G. Nevill, 1885
 Rissoina monilis A. Adams, 1851
 Rissoina montagui Weinkauff, 1881
 Rissoina multicostata (C. B. Adams, 1850)
 Rissoina multilineata Turton, 1932 
 Rissoina myosoroides Récluz in Schwartz, 1864
 Rissoina nelsoni Grabau & King, 1928
 Rissoina neptis Faber, 2013
 Rissoina nevilliana Weinkauff, 1881
 Rissoina nielseni (Laseron, 1950)
 Rissoina nitida A. Adams, 1851
 Rissoina nivea A. Adams, 1853 
 Rissoina obeliscus Schwartz, 1860
 Rissoina okinawensis Sleurs, 1993 
 † Rissoina oolitensis Faber, 2017 
 Rissoina opalia Faber, 2013
 Rissoina otohimeae Kosuge, 1965
 Rissoina oryza Garrett, 1873 
 Rissoina ovalis (Chang & Wu, 2004) 
 Rissoina pachystoma Melvill, 1896
 Rissoina parkeri Olsson & Harbison, 1953 
 Rissoina peaseana Weinkauff, 1881
 Rissoina pellucida Preston, 1905
 Rissoina peninsularis Bartsch, 1915
 Rissoina percrassa G. Nevill & H. Nevill, 1874
 † Rissoina pleistocena Bartsch, 1915 
 Rissoina plicata A. Adams,  1853
 Rissoina plicatula Gould, 1861
 Rissoina powelli Finlay, 1930
 Rissoina praecida (Laseron, 1956)
 Rissoina privati (Folin, 1867) 
 Rissoina pseudoprinceps Weinkauff, 1884
 Rissoina pulchella Brazier, 1877 
 Rissoina punctatissima Tate, 1899
 Rissoina punctostriata (Talavera, 1975)
 † Rissoina puntagordana Weisbord, 1962 
 Rissoina pusilla Brocchi
 † Rissoina pygmaea Cossmann, 1888 
 Rissoina pyramidalis A. Adams, 1851
 † Rissoina pyrgus Woodring, 1928 
 Rissoina quasillus Melvill & Standen, 1896 
 Rissoina quasimodo Faber, 2013
 † Rissoina raincourti Cossmann, 1885 
 Rissoina redferni Espinosa & Ortea, 2002
 Rissoina registomoides Melvill & Standen, 1903
 Rissoina rhyllensis Gatliff & Gabriel, 1908
 † Rissoina rilebana Ladd, 1966 
 Rissoina rissoi Weinkauff, 1885 ex Audouin
 † Rissoina rituola Woodring, 1928 
 Rissoina robini Paulmier, 2017
 Rissoina royana (Iredale, 1924)
 Rissoina sagraiana (d’Orbigny, 1842)
 Rissoina scalariana A. Adams, 1853 
 Rissoina scalariformis (C.B. Adams, 1852)
 Rissoina sceptrumregis Melvill & Standen, 1901
 Rissoina schubelae Sleurs & Preece, 1994 
 Rissoina scolopax Souverbie, 1877 
 Rissoina sculptilis Garrett, 1873
 Rissoina sculpturata Preston, 1908
 † Rissoina semidecussata Boettger, 1901 
 Rissoina sigmifer Mörch, 1876 
 Rissoina simplicissima Thiele, 1925
 Rissoina sismondiana  Issel, 1869 
 Rissoina smithi Angas, 1867 
 Rissoina sorror Sleurs, 1994
 Rissoina spiralis Souverbie, 1866
 Rissoina spirata Sowerby G.B. I, 1820
 Rissoina spirata montrouzieri (Souverbie, 1862 in Souverbie & Montrouzier, 1859–79)
 Rissoina striata (Quoy & Gaimard, 1833)
 Rissoina stricta (Menke, 1850) 
 Rissoina strigillata Gould, 1861
  † Rissoina sturanii Zunino & Pavia, 2009
 † Rissoina subagathostoma Gougerot & Le Renard, 1978 
 Rissoina subconcinna Souverbie in Souverbie & Montrouzier, 1872
 Rissoina subdebilis Weinkauff, 1881
 Rissoina subfuniculata Weinkauff, 1881
  †Rissoina submercurialis Yokoyama, 1920
 Rissoina subulina Weinkauff, 1881
 Rissoina subvillica Weinkauff, 1881
 Rissoina sundaica Thiele, 1925
 Rissoina taiwanica Chang & Wu, 2004
 Rissoina tenuistrata Pease, 1868
 Rissoina terebra Garrett, 1873
 Rissoina thatcheria Chang & Wu, 2004
 Rissoina tibicen Melvill, 1912
 Rissoina tongunensis Wen-Der Chen, 2008
 Rissoina tornatilis Gould, 1861
 Rissoina torresiana (Laseron, 1956) 
 Rissoina townsendi Bartsch, 1915
 Rissoina triangularis Watson, 1886
 † Rissoina tricarinata Morris & Lycett, 1851 
 † Rissoina trilirata P. J. Fischer, 1921 
 Rissoina tumidula Lycett, 1863 †
 Rissoina tutongensis Harzhauser, Raven & Landau, 2018 †
 Rissoina usitata Laseron, 1950
 Rissoina vanderspoeli Jong & Coomans, 1988 
 Rissoina vangoethemorum Sleurs, 1994
 Rissoina variegata Angas, 1867
 Rissoina villica Gould, 1861
 Rissoina vincentiana Cotton, 1952
 † Rissoina vittata Gardner, 1947 
 Rissoina walkeri E. A. Smith, 1893
 † Rissoina waluensis Ladd, 1966  
 Rissoina weinkauffiana Nevill, 1881
 Rissoina woodmasoniana G. Nevill, 1885
 Rissoina zeltneri (de Folin, 1867)
 Rissoina zonata Suter, 1909
 Rissoina zonula Melvill & Standen, 1896 

The Indo-Pacific Moluscan Database also includes many more species with names in current use 

 Subgenus Phosinella
 Rissoina burdigalensis d'Orbigny, 1852
 Rissoina dunkeriana (Kuroda & Habe in Habe, 1961)

 Subgenus Rissoina
 Rissoina perpusilla Nevill, 1884
 Rissoina rosea (Deshayes, 1863)

Species brought into synonymy
 †  Rissoina abbotti Ladd, 1966: synonym of † Zebinella abbotti (Ladd, 1866) 
 Rissoina abnormis G. Nevill & H. Nevill, 1875: synonym of Stosicia abnormis (G. Nevill & H. Nevill, 1875)
 Rissoina abrardi (Ladd, 1966): synonym of Ailinzebina abrardi (Ladd, 1966)
 Rissoina adamsiana Weinkauff, 1881: synonym of Zebina adamsiana (Weinkauff, 1881)
 Rissoina affinis Garrett, 1873: synonym of Zebinella tenuistriata (Pease, 1868)
  †  Rissoina alexisi Ladd, 1966: synonym of Phosinella digera (Laseron, 1956) (junior synonym)
 Rissoina allanae Laseron, 1950: synonym of Phosinella allanae (Laseron, 1950)
 Rissoina allemani Bartsch, 1931: synonym of Zebinella allemani (Bartsch, 1931)
 Rissoina angulata (Laseron, 1956): synonym of Zebinella angulata (Laseron, 1956)
 Rissoina angusta (Laseron, 1956): synonym of Pyramidelloides angustus (Hedley, 1898)
 Rissoina annulata Dunker, 1859: synonym of Stosicia annulata (Dunker, 1859)
 Rissoina annulata Hutton, 1884: synonym of Eatoniella olivacea (Hutton, 1882)
 Rissoina axelliana Hertlein & Strong, 1951: synonym of Zebina axeliana (Hertlein & Strong, 1951) 
 Rissoina baculumpastoris Melvill & Standen, 1896: synonym of Pyramidelloides baculumpastoris (Melvill & Standen, 1896)
 Rissoina bakeri Bartsch, 1915: synonym of Schwartziella bakeri (Bartsch, 1902)
 Rissoina barthelowi Bartsch, 1915: synonym of Zebinella barthelowi (Bartsch, 1915)
 Rissoina bellardii Issel, 1869: synonym of Pyramidelloides mirandus (A. Adams, 1861)
 Rissoina bellula A. Adams, 1851: synonym of Phosinella bellula (A. Adams, 1851)
 Rissoina bermudensis Peile, 1926: synonym of Schwartziella bryerea (Montagu, 1803)
 Rissoina berryi Baker, Hanna & Strong, 1930: synonym of Couthouyella menesthoides (Carpenter, 1864)
 Rissoina bilabiata Boettger, 1893: synonym of Schwartziella bilabiata (Boettger, 1893)
 Rissoina birestes (Laseron, 1956): synonym of Rissoina plicatula Gould, 1861
 Rissoina bougei Bavay, 1917: synonym of Stosicia bougei (Bavay, 1917)
 Rissoina browniana (d'Orbigny, 1842): synonym of Zebina browniana (d’Orbigny, 1842)
 Rissoina bruguierei (Payraudeau, 1826): synonym of Rissoina bruguieri (Payraudeau, 1826)
 Rissoina bryerea (Montagu, 1803): synonym of Schwartziella bryerea (Montagu, 1803)
 Rissoina burragei Bartsch, 1915: synonym of Schwartziella burragei (Bartsch, 1915)
 Rissoina caelata (Laseron, 1956): synonym of Rissoina striata (Quoy & Gaimard, 1833)
 Rissoina californica Bartsch, 1915: synonym of Schwartziella californica (Bartsch, 1915)
 Rissoina cancellata Philippi, 1847: synonym of Phosinella cancellata (Philippi, 1847)
 Rissoina cancellina Rolán & Fernández-Garcés, 2010: synonym of Phosinella cancellina (Rolán & Fernández-Garcés, 2010) (Phosinella accepted as full genus)
 Rissoina carpentariensis Hedley, 1912: synonym of Iravadia carpentariensis (Hedley, 1912)
 Rissoina castaneogramma Garrett, 1873: synonym of Phosinella castaneogramma (Garrett, 1873)
 Rissoina clathrata A. Adams, 1853: synonym of Phosinella clathrata (A. Adams, 1853)
 Rissoina cleo Bartsch, 1915: synonym of Schwartziella cleo (Bartsch, 1915)
 Rissoina columen Melvill, 1904: synonym of Chevallieria columen (Melvill, 1904)
 Rissoina concinna (Laseron, 1956): synonym of Zebinella concinna (Laseron, 1956)
 Rissoina congenita E. A. Smith, 1890: synonym of Schwartziella congenita (E. A. Smith, 1890)
 Rissoina conica (C. B. Adams, 1850): synonym of Vitreolina conica (C. B. Adams, 1850)
 Rissoina conifera Montagu, 1803: synonym of * Phosinella conifera (Montagu, 1803)
 Rissoina costatogranosa Garrett, 1873: synonym of Phosinella costatogranosa (Garrett, 1873)
 Rissoina costulata Pease, 1867: synonym of Rissoina cerithiiformis Tryon, 1887
 Rissoina coulthardi Webster, 1908: synonym of Nozeba emarginata (Hutton, 1885)
 Rissoina cyatha (Laseron, 1956): synonym of Phosinella cyatha (Laseron, 1956)
 Rissoina cylindrica Bozzetti, 2009: synonym of Rissoina (Moerchiella) bozzettii Faber, 2015
 Rissoina cylindracea Tenison Woods, 1878: synonym of Epigrus cylindraceus (Tenison Woods, 1878)
 Rissoina decipiens E. A. Smith, 1890: synonym of Schwartziella bryerea (Montagu, 1803)
 Rissoina decussata (Montagu, 1803): synonym of Zebinella decussata (Montagu, 1803)
 Rissoina deshayesiana (Récluz, 1843): synonym of Phosinella deshayesiana (Récluz, 1843)
 Rissoina decipiens (Laseron, 1956): synonym of Schwartziella bryerea (Montagu, 1803)
 Rissoina decussata (Montagu, 1803): synonym of Zebinella decussata (Montagu, 1803)
 Rissoina detrita Boettger, 1893: synonym of Rissoina dorbignyi A. Adams, 1851
 Rissoina dimidiata Jickeli, 1882: synonym of Rissoina dorbignyi A. Adams, 1851
 Rissoina digera (Laseron, 1956): synonym of Phosinella digera (Laseron, 1956)
 Rissoina efficata Brazier, 1877: synonym of Rissoina antoni Schwartz, 1860
 Rissoina effusa Mörch, 1860: synonym of Schwartziella effusa (Mörch, 1860)
 † Rissoina eleonorae Boettger, 1901: synonym of Zebinella eleonorae (Boettger, 1901) 
 Rissoina elevata (Laseron, 1956): synonym of Phosinella elevata (Laseron, 1956)
 Rissoina elegantissima (d’Orbigny, 1842): synonym of Ailinzebina elegantissima (d'Orbigny, 1842)
 Rissoina elspethae Melvill, 1910: synonym of Chevallieria columen (Melvill, 1904)
 Rissoina emina (Laseron, 1956): synonym of Phosinella emina (Laseron, 1956)
 Rissoina enteles Melvill & Standen, 1896: synonym of Rissoina imbricata Gould, 1861
 Rissoina ephamella (Watson, 1886) sensu Laseron, 1956: synonym of Schwartziella ephamilla (Watson, 1886)
 Rissoina ephamilla (Watson, 1886): synonym of Schwartziella ephamilla (Watson, 1886) 
 Rissoina ericana Hertlein & Strong, 1951: synonym of Folinia ericana (Hertlein & Strong, 1951)
 Rissoina eucosmia Bartsch, 1915: synonym of Pyramidelloides mirandus (A. Adams, 1861)
 Rissoina evanida Nevill, 1874: synonym of Zebinella evanida (G. Nevill & H. Nevill, 1881)
 Rissoina exasperata Souverbie, 1866: synonym of Phosinella exasperata (Souverbie, 1866)
 Rissoina firmata (C. B. Adams, 1852): synonym of Schwartziella firmata (C. B. Adams, 1852)
 Rissoina floridana Olsson, A.A. & A. Harbison, 1953: synonym of Schwartziella floridana (Olsson, A.A. & A. Harbison, 1953)
 Rissoina gemmea Hedley, 1899: synonym of Phosinella gemmea (Hedley, 1899)
 Rissoina gemmulata Turton, 1932: synonym of Pyramidelloides mirandus (A. Adams, 1861)
 Rissoina harperi Dautzenberg & Bouge, 1933: synonym of Rissoina cerithiiformis Tryon, 1887
 Rissoina hedleyi Tate, 1899: synonym of Stosicia hedleyi (Tate, 1899)
 Rissoina helenae E. A. Smith, 1890: synonym of Schwartziella helenae (E. A. Smith, 1890)
 † Rissoina heterolira Laws, 1941: synonym of † Zebinella heterolira (Laws, 1941) 
 Rissoina histia Bartsch, 1915: synonym of Folinia histia (Bartsch, 1915)
 Rissoina horrida Garrett, 1873: synonym of Costabieta horrida (Garrett, 1873)
 Rissoina hungerfordiana Weinkauff, 1881: synonym of Phosinella hungerfordiana (Weinkauff, 1881)
 Rissoina hystrix Souverbie, 1877: synonym of Pyramidelloides mirandus (A. Adams, 1861)
 Rissoina infratincta (Garrett, 1873): synonym of Phosinella infratincta (Garrett, 1873)
 Rissoina insolita Deshayes, 1863: synonym of Pyramidelloides mirandus (A. Adams, 1861)
 Rissoina japonica Weinkauff, 1881: synonym of Zebina japonica (Weinkauff, 1881)
 Rissoina kesteveni Hedley, 1907: synonym of Herewardia kesteveni (Hedley, 1907)
 Rissoina laeta Preston, 1908: synonym of Rissoina artensis Montrouzier, 1872
 Rissoina laevicostulata Pilsbry, 1904: synonym of Rissoina plicatula Gould, 1861
 Rissoina lamberti Souverbie, 1870: synonym of Rissoina antoni Schwartz, 1860
 Rissoina lankaensis Preston, 1905: synonym of Rissoina antoni Schwartz, 1860
 Rissoina lapazana Bartsch, 1915: synonym of Lirobarleeia kelseyi (Dall & Bartsch, 1902)
 † Rissoina lepida Woodring, 1928 : synonym of † Mirarissoina lepida (Woodring, 1928) 
 Rissoina leucophanes Tomlin, 1931: synonym of Schwartziella leucophanes (Tomlin, 1931)
 'Rissoina lirata (Carpenter, 1857): synonym of Lirobarleeia lirata (Carpenter, 1857)
 Rissoina lowei Strong, 1938: synonym of Lirobarleeia kelseyi (Dall & Bartsch, 1902)
 Rissoina media Schwartz, 1860: synonym of Phosinella media (Schwartz, 1860)
 † Rissoina mijana Ladd, 1966 : synonym of † Zebinella mijana (Ladd, 1866) 
 Rissoina miltozona Tomlin, 1915: synonym of Rissoina cerithiiformis Tryon, 1887
  † Rissoina minuta (Gabb, 1873): synonym of † Zebinella minuta (Gabb, 1873) 
  Rissoina minutissima Tenison Woods, 1878: synonym of Pseudorissoina perexiguus (Tate & May, 1900)
 Rissoina mirabilis Weinkauff, 1881: synonym of Stosicia mirabilis (Weinkauff, 1881)
 Rissoina miranda A. Adams, 1861: synonym of Pyramidelloides mirandus (A. Adams, 1861)
 Rissoina montrouzieri Souverbie, 1862: synonym of Rissoina dorbignyi A. Adams, 1851
 Rissoina multicostata (Garrett, 1857): synonym of Rissoina costulifera Pease, 1862
 Rissoina nereina Bartsch, 1915: synonym of Schwartziella nereina (Bartsch, 1915)
 Rissoina nesiotes Melvill & Standen, 1896: synonym of Rissoina spiralis Souverbie, 1866 
 Rissoina newcombei Dall, 1897: synonym of Schwartziella newcombei (Dall, 1897)
 Rissoina nitida A. Adams, 1853: synonym of Phosinella nitida (A. Adams, 1853)
 Rissoina nodicincta A. Adams, 1853: synonym of Phosinella nodicincta (A. Adams, 1853)
 Rissoina olivacea (Hutton, 1884): synonym of Eatoniella olivacea (Hutton, 1882)
  † Rissoina oncera Woodring, 1957: synonym of † Phosinella oncera (Woodring, 1957) 
 Rissoina onobiformis Rolán & Luque, 2000: synonym of Ailinzebina onobiformis (Rolán & Luque, 2000)
 Rissoina orbignyi: synonym of Rissoina dorbignyi A. Adams, 1851
 Rissoina oscitans Preston, 1905: synonym of Iravadia delicata (Philippi, 1849)
 Rissoina paenula (Laseron, 1956): synonym of Phosinella paenula (Laseron, 1956)
 Rissoina paschalis Melvill & Standen, 1901: synonym of Stosicia paschalis (Melvill & Standen, 1901)
 Rissoina perita Sleurs, 1992: synonym of Rissoina evanida (Laseron, 1956)
 Rissoina phormis Melvill, 1904: synonym of Phosinella phormis (Melvill, 1904)
 Rissoina polytropa Hedley, 1899: synonym of Stosicia mirabilis (Weinkauff, 1881)
 Rissoina porteri Baker, Hanna & Strong, 1930: synonym of Schwartziella ephamilla (Watson, 1886) 
 Rissoina preposterum (Berry, 1958): synonym of Zebina preposterum (Berry, 1958)
 Rissoina princeps (C. B. Adams, 1850): synonym of Zebinella princeps (C. B. Adams, 1850)
 Rissoina pseudoconcinna Nevill, 1885: synonym of Stosicia mirabilis (Weinkauff, 1881)
 Rissoina pseudoescalaris Melvill & Standen, 1901: synonym of Opalia pseudoescalaris (Melvill & Standen, 1901)
 Rissoina pulchra (C. B. Adams, 1850): synonym of Phosinella pulchra (C. B. Adams, 1850)
 Rissoina pura (Gould, 1861): synonym of Phosinella pura (Gould, 1861)
 Rissoina refugium Melvill, 1918: synonym of Chiliostigma refugium (Melvill, 1918)
 Rissoina retecosa Thiele, 1925: synonym of Phosinella retecosa (Thiele, 1925)
 Rissoina reticulataG.B.  Sowerby I, 1824: synonym of Moerchiella reticulata (G. B. Sowerby I, 1833) (Moerchiella accepted as genus)
 Rissoina rex Pilsbry, 1904: synonym of Mormula rex (Pilsbry, 1904)
 Rissoina samoensis Weinkauff, 1881: synonym of Stosicia abnormis (G. Nevill & H. Nevill, 1875)
 Rissoina scabra Garrett, 1873: synonym of Phosinella scabra (Garrett, 1873)
 Rissoina schmackeri Boettger, 1887: synonym of Phosinella schmackeri (Boettger, 1887)
 Rissoina seguenziana Issel, 1869: synonym of Phosinella seguenziana (Issel, 1869)
 Rissoina semisculpta Tate, 1899: synonym of Rissoina antoni Schwartz, 1860
 Rissoina signae Bartsch, 1915: synonym of Folinia signae (Bartsch, 1915)
 Rissoina smithii Tryon, 1887: synonym of Eatoniella caliginosa (E. A. Smith, 1875)
 Rissoina sincera Melvill & Standen, 1896: synonym of Phosinella sincera (Melvill & Standen, 1896)
 Rissoina stephensae Baker, Hanna & Strong, 1930 : synonym of Diala stephensae (Baker, Hanna & Strong, 1930)
 Rissoina striatocostata (d’Orbigny, 1842): synonym of Zebinella striatocostata (d’Orbigny, 1842)
 Rissoina striatula Pease, 1867: synonym of Rissoina imbricata Gould, 1861
 Rissoina striolata A. Adams, 1851: synonym of Moerchiella striolata (A. Adams, 1853)
 Rissoina striosa (C. B. Adams, 1850): synonym of Zebinella striosa (C. B. Adams, 1850)
 Rissoina sumatrensis Thiele, 1925: synonym of Phosinella sumatrensis (Thiele, 1925)
 Rissoina supracostata Garrett, 1873: synonym of Rissoina artensis Montrouzier, 1872
 Rissoina teres Brazier, 1877: synonym of Phosinella teres (Brazier, 1877)
 Rissoina thaumasia Melvill & Standen, 1898: synonym of Rissoina antoni Schwartz, 1860
 Rissoina tomlini Bavay, 1917: synonym of Ailinzebina tomlini (Bavay, 1917)
 Rissoina triticea Pease, 1861: synonym of Schwartziella triticea (Pease, 1861)
 Rissoina trochlearis Gould, 1861: synonym of Stosicia annulata (Dunker, 1859)
 Rissoina truncata (Laseron, 1956) : synonym of Pandalosia subfirmata (O. Boettger, 1887)
 Rissoina turricula Pease, 1860: synonym of Rissoina costata A. Adams, 1851
 Rissoina turrita (Garrett, 1873): synonym of Tomlinella insignis (Adams & Reeve, 1850)
 Rissoina turtoni E. A. Smith, 1890: synonym of Schwartziella turtoni (E. A. Smith, 1890)
 Rissoina ultima (Laseron, 1956): synonym of Phosinella ultima (Laseron, 1956)
 Rissoina vanpeli De Jong & Coomans, 1988: synonym of Schwartziella vanpeli (De Jong & Coomans, 1988)
 Rissoina viaderi Tomlin, 1939: synonym of Pyramidelloides angustus (Hedley, 1898)
 Rissoina villica Gould, 1861: synonym of Rissoina antoni Schwartz, 1860
 Rissoina warnefordiae Preston, 1908: synonym of Phosinella warnefordiae (Preston, 1908)
 Rissoina woodwardii Carpenter, 1857: synonym of Schwartziella woodwardii (Carpenter, 1857)
 Rissoina yendoi Yokoyama, 1927: synonym of Iravadia yendoi (Yokoyama, 1927)
Nomina dubia
 Rissoina balteata Pease, 1869
 Rissoina erythraea Philippi, 1851
 Rissoina grandis Philippi, 1847

References

 Ponder, W.F., 1985, A review of the genera of the Rissoidae (Mollusca: Mesogastropoda: Rissoacea), Rec. Aust. Mus, suppl. 4:1-221
 Sleurs, W.J.M. (1993). A revision of the Recent species of Rissoina (Moerchiella), R. (Apataxia), R. (Ailinzebina) and R. (Pachyrissoina) (Gastropoda: Rissoidae). Med. K. Belg. Inst. Nat. Wet. 63: 71-135
 Rolán E. & Fernández-Garcés R. 2010. New information on the Caribbean Rissoina (Gastropoda, Rissoidae) of the group R. sagraiana-cancellata with the description of a new species''. Iberus 28(1): 79-89

External links

Rissoinidae